The 2000–01 First League of FR Yugoslavia was the ninth season of the FR Yugoslavia's top-level football league since its establishment. It was contested by 18 teams, and Red Star Belgrade won the championship.

Incidents

Eternal derby abandoned
The 115th edition of the Eternal derby match between Red Star Belgrade and FK Partizan on Saturday, 14 October 2000 at the Marakana was abandoned after three minutes of play due to fan rioting. The incident began with Partizan fans, Grobari, pelting the pitch with flares at which point the match play got interrupted. The rioting kept escalating with the southern stand seating being torn off by the Grobari and thrown onto the athletic track. At one point, the team captain Saša Ilić was seen in front of the stand pleading to no avail with the Partizan ultra supporters to stop rioting. Dozens of Grobari eventually either jumped over or broke through the fence and began invading the pitch at which point the more numerous Red Star fans from the opposite end of the stadium stormed the pitch en masse, attacking the Partizan fans as well as Partizan players and coaching staff that were still on the pitch. 

What ensued was mass brawling and running battles among the two sets of fans that led to the more numerous Red Star ultras quickly overpowering their Partizan counterparts and pushing them back towards the southern stand. In addition to injuries to a number Partizan fans that invaded the pitch, several Partizan players and members of the club's coaching staff reported injuries as a result being attacked by the Red Star fans. Partizan's twenty-year-old forward Ivica Iliev received head injuries with hematoma from being punched in the face while the team's head coach Ljubiša Tumbaković ended up with a laceration above his eye.

Some thirty five minutes since the incident began, the match was officially called off. According to press reports, 35 fans 2 policemen were injured, none severely. Six fans, two of them unconscious, were transported to Belgrade's Urgentni centar.

The match was replayed in full on Wednesday, 7 March 2001.

Teams 
Proleter Zrenjanin, Hajduk Beograd, Mogren, Spartak Subotica, and Borac Čačak were relegated to the Second League of FR Yugoslavia.

The relegated teams were replaced by 1999–2000 Second League of FR Yugoslavia champions, Napredak Kruševac (East) and Zeta (West).

League table

Results

Winning squad
Champions: Red Star Belgrade (Coach: Slavoljub Muslin)

Players (league matches/league goals)
  Milenko Ačimovič
  Srđan Bajčetić
  Branko Bošković
  Goran Bunjevčević
  Milivoje Vitakić
  Ivan Vukomanović
  Blaže Georgioski
  Stevo Glogovac
  Ivan Gvozdenović
  Goran Drulić
  Petar Đenić
  Saša Zorić
  Dejan Ilić
  Branko Jelić
  Aleksandar Kocić (goalkeeper)
  Nenad Lalatović
  Leo Lerinc
  Jovan Markoski
  Marjan Marković
  Vladimir Matijašević
  Vladislav Mirković
  Dejan Pešić
  Mihajlo Pjanović
  Dragan Stevanović
Source:

Top goalscorers

References

External links 
 Tables and results at RSSSF

Yugoslav First League seasons
Yugo
1